Target was a British police action drama series, which ran from 1977 to 1978, on BBC1. Set in Southampton, it starred Patrick Mower as Det. Supt. Steve Hackett, Brendan Price as Det. Sgt. Frank Bonney, Vivien Heilbron as Det. Sgt. Louise Colbert and Philip Madoc as Det. Chief Supt. Tate. Seventeen fifty-minute episodes were produced and the theme music was by Dudley Simpson. It was the BBC's response to ITV's successful series The Sweeney, but received criticism for its levels of violence and lasted for just two seasons.

Background
Target was set in Southampton and involved the 13th Regional Crime Squad. The series was originally developed under the title Hackett by former Z-Cars script editor Graham Williams, but he was asked to swap roles with the outgoing producer of Doctor Who, Philip Hinchcliffe. Hinchcliffe retitled the show Target. He also persuaded the BBC to make the series entirely on film instead of the usual BBC production method at the time of mixing video studio scenes with film for location work.

Initial reaction
At the time, the show was criticised for its level of violence. The BBC's Director of Programmes, Alasdair Milne, reportedly received 5,000 letters of complaint from Mary Whitehouse's League of Light. Its release also coincided with the publication of the Belson Report (Television violence and the adolescent boy). The first series was curtailed and the second series toned down the level of violence.

Cancellation
A third series was mooted, with Robert Banks Stewart taking over as producer. He spent two weeks in the producer's role, during which he planned to change the supporting cast, reduce the violence and steer the show further away from The Sweeney. Banks Stewart wanted James Bolam as the new lead but Bolam preferred to do one final series of When the Boat Comes In first.

Different reasons have been given for the cancellation of Target. According to Philip Hinchcliffe's account on the DVD commentary for Doctor Who serial The Seeds of Doom, the series was ultimately cancelled because Alasdair Milne didn't like it. Banks Stewart said he was asked by Graeme MacDonald, the BBC's Head of Series and Serials, whether he would prefer to scrap Target altogether and produce a new series. He then devised the private eye drama Shoestring. However, Patrick Mower offered a view which was slightly different: he wanted to terminate his commitment anyway. With reference to the rather unfortunate fate of The Professionals lead actor Lewis Collins, he emphasized in the late 1990s that he did not like to be identified with one particular role and, for this reason, he had made it his policy never to appear in a series for more than two years.

Some of the episodes were written by David Wickes, who also wrote scripts for The Professionals and his production company, David Wickes Productions, produced The New Professionals in 1999.

Cars
Like The Sweeney, the cars used were Fords, mostly Cortinas and Granadas. However, Hackett's personal car, seen in several episodes, is a 1969 Mercury Cougar.

Official releases
In 1983, the BBC tried to relaunch the series on the then-soaring video market, releasing the pilot, Shipment, on VHS tape. However, no further releases were forthcoming.

Four episodes from the first series – Shipment, Big Elephant, Lady Luck and Carve Up – were repeated out of sequence immediately after the second series, while all but two episodes of the second series – The Trouble with Charlie and Figures of Importance – were repeated in a late night slot in the spring of 1980. The first series aired on now-defunct British Satellite Broadcasting cable channel, Galaxy, in 1990.

All seventeen episodes survive in C1 format (16 mm film), in the BBC archives. Some sources, such as Halliwell/Purser, claim that there were twenty-two episodes but this is simply a mistake.

Novels
Two Target novels were published. It seems that writers, Michael Feeney Callan and Simon Masters, were asked to turn their scripts into novels, so that the BBC could put them on the market.

Series One 1977

Series Two 1978

References

External links
 
 Media Gems – Target

1977 British television series debuts
1978 British television series endings
BBC television dramas
1970s British crime television series
1970s British drama television series
English-language television shows
Television shows set in Hampshire